Zygia steyermarkii is a species of flowering plant in the family Fabaceae. It can only be found in Ecuador.

References

steyermarkii
Flora of Ecuador
Endangered plants
Taxonomy articles created by Polbot